The 1st Aeromedical Evacuation Group (1 AEG) was a unit of the United States Air Force. It was created in 1951, and inactivated on 1 July 1975 when it was replaced by 1st Aeromedical Evacuation Squadron.

Lineage
 Constituted as the 1st Aeromedical Evacuation Group
 Activated on 28 November 1951
 Inactivated on 1 September 1954
 Activated on 19 March 1957
 Inactivated on 1 July 1975

Assignments
 Eighteenth Air Force: 28 November 1951
 Tactical Air Command: unknown
 Eighteenth Air Force: 1 January 1954 – 1 September 1954
 USAF Tactical Medical Center, 19 March 1957
 464th Troop Carrier Wing, ca. 15 September 1957
 Tactical Air Command, ca, 1 July 1970
 375th Aeromedical Airlift Wing, 1 December 1974 – 1 July 1975

Stations
 Donaldson Air Force Base, South Carolina, 28 November 1951 – 1 September 1954
 Donaldson Air Force Base, South Carolina, 19 March 1957
 Pope Air Force Base, North Carolina, 15 September 1957 – 1 July 1975

Components
 21st Aeromedical Evacuation Squadron, 19 March 1957 – 1 July 1970
 22nd Aeromedical Evacuation Squadron, 19 March 1957 – 1 July 1970
 18th Casualty Staging Flight (later 18th Aeromedical Staging Flight), 1 July 1968 – 1 July 1975

References

Notes

Bibliography

 

Aeromedical evacuation groups of the United States Air Force